Ymer Pampuri (30 April 1944 – 18 January 2017) was an Albanian weightlifter who in the 1972 Summer Olympic Games became the first Albanian to break an Olympic record, the first Albanian to become a World Champion and the last World Champion in military press, since the discipline was no longer allowed to be practiced internationally after 1972.

Life and career
Pampuri was born in Tirana. When he was seven years old he joined the Tirana Circus as an acrobat. In 1972 he was chosen to represent Albania in the European Championship in Romania. He lifted 125 kg, the same weight as the champion, but ended up second only losing by his body mass. In the same year he participated in the 1972 Summer Olympics. In 1972, when Pampuri and his coach, Zydi Mazreku, declared before their departure that they were going to bring a medal from the Munich Olympics, many of the directors of the Albanian sports laughed.  At the age of 27, the 17 Nentori weightlifter broke the Olympic record established by Yoshinobu Miyake  in the clean and press style by lifting 127.5 kg. It was 29 August 1972 when Pampuri broke the record and became World Champion in that discipline.

References

External links
  – An article talking about Ymer Pampuri.
Ymer Pampuri's obituary

1944 births
2017 deaths
Sportspeople from Tirana
Albanian male weightlifters
Weightlifters at the 1972 Summer Olympics
Olympic weightlifters of Albania
World Weightlifting Championships medalists